Kita Airport  is an airport serving Kita, a town and commune in the Kayes Cercle in the Kayes Region of Mali.

References

Airports in Mali